Bartholomew Tipping may refer to:

Bartholomew Tipping IV (1648–1718), High Sheriff of Berkshire
Bartholomew Tipping VII (1735–1798), High Sheriff of Berkshire